"We Went" is a song recorded by American country music artist Randy Houser. It was initially released online via Rolling Stone Country on April 27, 2015, with a wide release on May 18. It is the lead single to Houser's fourth studio album, Fired Up, which was released March 11, 2016. The song was written by Justin Wilson, Matt Rogers and John King. It's the only song that was successful from the album.

Music video
The music video for "We Went" was directed by Dustin Rikert and premiered in August 2015.

Critical reception
Billy Dukes of Taste of Country gave the song a positive review, saying that "The How Country Feels album was a commercial comeback album for Houser, but this song feels more personal. Maybe he's just more confident after several No. 1 hits. "We Went" is not a true vocal showcase a la "Like a Cowboy," but there's enough power between his voice and this arrangement to remind fans he's not resting on a good year or two."

Chart performance
The single has sold 300,000 copies in the US as of March 2016.

Year-end charts

References

2015 songs
2015 singles
Randy Houser songs
BBR Music Group singles